The Alajärvi administrative centre (Finnish: Alajärven hallintokeskus) is a buildings complex in the city of Alajärvi, Finland, comprising the city hall and related offices, health centre, parish hall and other buildings.  It was designed by Finnish architect Alvar Aalto, who also designed the adjacent library building.

Details
The city hall and health centre were completed in 1967; the parish hall became ready in 1970.

The complex has been designated and protected by the Finnish Heritage Agency as a nationally important built cultural environment (Valtakunnallisesti merkittävä rakennettu kulttuuriympäristö).

Aalto was born and raised near Alajärvi and had a close connection with the area, and consequently designed several buildings there. The Museovirasto has classified the administrative center as a cultural site of national interest in Finland.

See also

 Alajärvi city library

References

Alvar Aalto buildings
Alajärvi
Buildings and structures in South Ostrobothnia
Government buildings completed in 1967
City and town halls in Finland
Modernist architecture in Finland